Satana may refer to:

Satana, name for the Devil in various languages, variation of Satan 
Satana (Marvel Comics), a fictional character in Marvel Comics
Satana, India, a town in Nashik district, Maharashtra, India
Satanaya, aka Satana, a mythological figure from the Nart saga of the Northern Caucasus
Tura Satana (born 1935), Japanese-American actress
Satana, a fictional character in the Italian horror-western comic Djustine

See also
Satan (disambiguation)
Satanas (disambiguation)